Metanarsia partilella is a moth of the family Gelechiidae. It is found in Turkmenistan and Uzbekistan.

The length of the forewings is 10–11 mm. The forewings are greyish-white and the hindwings are dark grey. Adults are on wing in May.

References

Moths described in 1887
Metanarsia